Flat Chat is an Australian sitcom that  screened on the Nine Network in 2001.

Flat Chat tells the story of two very different women, a socialite and a bogan, whose lives change when their circumstances are reversed. Socialite Claire Jansen is forced to sell her mansion when her husband dies, leaving her flat broke. She moves into the stables when the house is bought by a rich but vulgar man and his new young wife who is unused to the ways of society. The two women form an unlikely alliance as they struggle to adjust to their new circumstances.

Cast
 Jean Kittson as Claire Jansen 
 Alexandra Davies as Julie Coyne 
 Richard Healy as Barry Coyne 
 Richard Wilson as Nick Jansen 
 Marco Pio Venturini as Anthony Coreno 
 Sarah Chadwick as Sarah 
 Merridy Eastman as Katie 
 Sally Strecker as Arnya Duchevnic

Viewership

<onlyinclude>{| class="wikitable"
|-
! colspan="2" rowspan="2" width=3% |Season
! rowspan="2" width=5% |Episodes
! colspan="2" |Originally aired
! rowspan="2" width=5% |Network
! rowspan="2" width=5% |Viewers (millions)
! rowspan="2" width=5% | Rating
! rowspan="2" width=5% | Drama Rank
|-
! width=15% | Season premiere
! width=15% | Season finale
|-
|bgcolor="1E90FF" height="10px"|
|align="center"| 1
|align="center"| 13
|align="center"| 19 February 2001
|align="center"| 15 May 2001
|align="center"| Nine Network
|align="center"| 1.166
|align="center"| 8.9
! align="center"| #7
|}

See also 
 List of Australian television series

References

External links 
 

Nine Network original programming
Australian comedy television series
2001 Australian television series debuts
2001 Australian television series endings